Plans for high-speed rail in the United States date back to the High-Speed Ground Transportation Act of 1965. Various state and federal proposals have followed. Despite being one of the world's first countries to get high-speed trains (the Metroliner service in 1969), it failed to spread.

Other services reaching  are prevalent in the US, and are officially classified as higher-speed rail.

 the California High-Speed Rail Authority is working on the California High-Speed Rail project and construction is under way on sections traversing the Central Valley. The Central Valley section is planned to open in 2029 and Phase I is planned for completion in 2033.

Definitions in American context 

Authorities in the United States maintain various definitions of high-speed rail. There is no current rail service in the United States which meets all of the domestic criteria for high-speed rail. Amtrak's Acela is classified as "higher-speed rail" in the Congressional Research Service report by virtue of being on shared tracks, whereas page 5 of that report also requires dedicated tracks to be classified as "very high-speed rail".

In places where high-speed rail programs are in earlier developmental stages or where substantial speed increases are achieved by upgrading current infrastructure and/or introducing more advanced trains, lower minimum speed definitions of high-speed rail are used. This is the case in the United States. For transportation planning purposes focussing on the development of high-speed rail, the United States Department of Transportation (USDOT) distinguishes four types of intercity passenger rail corridors:
Top speeds of at least  on completely grade-separated, dedicated rights-of-way (with the possible exception of some shared track in terminal areas). Intended to relieve air and highway capacity constraints.
Intended to relieve highway and, to some extent, air capacity constraints.
Intended to develop the passenger rail market, and provide some relief to other modes.
 Conventional Rail: Traditional intercity passenger rail services of more than 100 miles with as little as one to as many as 7–12 daily frequencies; may or may not have strong potential for future high-speed rail service. Intended to provide travel options and to develop the passenger rail market for further development in the future.

However, state-level departments of transportation and council of governments may also use different definitions for high-speed rail.

History 
The development of the American rail network during the 19th century created structural impediments to the adoption of high-speed rail in the later half of the 20th that were not present in Europe and Asia. Freight on American railroads had to travel vastly longer distances, so railroads developed longer cars that could be joined into longer trains. In contrast to Europe, these freights traveled past very few older buildings that were at risk of structural damage from vibrations created by heavy passing trains.

With such long and heavy freights often sharing the same tracks as passenger trains, it was necessary to require that passenger cars be able to withstand the higher impact forces of a collision. Axial strength standards, first required for the mail cars where clerks worked sorting mail en route and later applied to passenger cars, require that an American passenger car be able to withstand  applied to either end, as opposed to the  European regulations mandate. This necessarily results in American passenger cars being heavier.

Faster inter-city trains: 1920–1941

From 1900 to 1941, most long-distance travel was by rail in the United States. Most of the major railroads had faster than normal trains called "express" or "limited" on their mainline routes (e.g. the Empire State Express and the 20th Century Limited) between major towns and cities.

The development of faster trains, however, faced indirect regulatory hurdles. After a 1921 crash at Porter, Indiana, in which a derail failed to stop one passenger train that had already passed through two red lights from crashing into another at a level junction, killing 37, the Interstate Commerce Commission (ICC) ordered almost a hundred railroads to install automatic train stops by the end of 1925. The railroads opposed the ICC vigorously, noting that stopping longer freights that way might lead to derailments. As a result, the requirement was revised to allow waivers for certain lines, and rarely enforced as the debate continued without any real resolution over the next two decades; in the meantime passenger fatalities began declining as the automobile emerged as a transportation option.

During the 1930s railroads began to develop lightweight, diesel-powered streamlined trains which provided even faster running times than the previous express trains. Two early streamliners were the Union Pacific M-10000 (nicknamed Little Zip and The City of Salina) in revenue service between 1934 and 1941/42 and the Burlington Railroad's Zephyr. The design of the Zephyr incorporated a diesel-electric power system; the M-10000 used a spark-ignition engine running on "petroleum distillate", a fuel similar to kerosene. These trains were much lighter than the common engines and passenger cars of the day, as the "Zephyr" was constructed using stainless steel and the M-10000 chiefly of the aircraft alloy Duralumin.

On May 26, 1934, the Zephyr made a record-breaking "Dawn to Dusk" run from Denver to Chicago. However the railroad was unable to capitalize on this since the Depression had cut into the demand for intercity rail travel.

Many steam locomotives were streamlined during this time to attract passengers, and the first steam streamlined locomotive was the New York Central's Commodore Vanderbilt. Nonetheless, some of these steam locomotives became very fast: some were said to exceed  on a regular basis. Examples include the New York Central's "Super Hudsons" as used on the 20th Century Limited; the Milwaukee Road's purpose-built Atlantics and Hudsons used in Hiawatha service; the Pennsylvania Railroad's duplex-drive 4-4-4-4 type T1 locomotives, and two Union Pacific engines, a 4-6-2 and a 4-8-2, used on the "Forty Niner" and other trains.

Post-war period: 1945–1960

The debate over signaling and train control between the railroads and the ICC had never really been settled, just deferred as passenger deaths declined, in part due to more travelers using their automobiles for shorter commutes and an expanding and improving highway network. It ended in 1946, when one express passenger train crashed into another one that had stopped, both operated by the Chicago, Burlington & Quincy, in Naperville, Illinois.

The engineer of the second train survived the crash, and claimed he had not seen the signal in sufficient time to stop his train. Investigation showed that even if he had missed the yellow light going on, warning him to slow down in anticipation of a red, he still had space to stop the train had he applied his full brakes at the red. As a result, the ICC decided the time had come to force the issue of train control.

For the first time it set national rail speed limits. This rule remains in force today.

While the railroads generally complied with this rule, affecting  of track, they were not as tolerant of the ICC"s additional requirement for ATS or cab signalling on passenger trains that exceeded . This was what the ICC had hoped for. But on the other  where the rule applied, railroads simply ran their trains under the limit. This made intercity passenger rail an even less competitive option, accelerating its decline as not only automobile use was increasing but airlines were beginning to compete on longer routes. By the late 1950s many passenger routes that had existed at the time of the Naperville crash had been discontinued.

The results of World War II shifted further high-speed rail technological development overseas. While the U.S. had not suffered the infrastructure damage it had inflicted on Europe and Japan, it had also developed its road network, leading to the creation of the Interstate Highway System after the war, giving prosperous citizens an efficient way to use the cars they were buying. Europe and Japan, by contrast, had largely not begun to build highway networks and had seen heavy damage to their rail systems. With their citizens impoverished as they rebuilt their economies, and unable to afford automobiles to the extent Americans could, those countries invested in rail as the primary means of intercity travel.

First attempts: 1960–1992

Following the creation of Japan's first high-speed Shinkansen, U.S. President Lyndon B. Johnson asked the U.S. Congress to devise a way to increase speeds on American railroads. The request was part of his Great Society infrastructure building initiatives. Congress delivered the High-Speed Ground Transportation Act of 1965 which passed with overwhelming bi-partisan support. It helped to create regular Metroliner service between New York City and Washington, D.C. inaugurated in 1969. The Metroliner was able to travel from New York to Washington in just 2.5 hours because it did not make any intermediate stops.

U.S. federal and state governments continued to revisit the idea of fast trains. The Passenger Railroad Rebuilding Act of 1980 led to funding of high-speed corridor studies in 1984. Private-sector consortia intending to build high-speed lines were created in Florida, Ohio, Texas, California, and Nevada. Maglev trains became a new field of interest. They were officially added to the definition of "railroad" in 1988, and were studied repeatedly. Five high-speed corridors were officially endorsed in October 1992 following passage of the Intermodal Surface Transportation Efficiency Act of 1991.
TEA-21 and other legislation continued to be passed with mentions of high-speed rail, but lacking funding or real direction. Nevertheless, no new high-speed service was added to the U.S. passenger rail system following the Metroliners.

Renewed interest: 1993–2008 

In 1993, the U.S. attempted to improve service between Boston and New York by electrifying the Northeast Corridor north of New Haven, Connecticut and purchasing new train sets to replace the by then 30-year-old Metroliners and run on the newly electrified route. Some existing trains (Swedish X 2000 and German ICE 1) were tested, but finally, the "Acela", a new tilting train manufactured by Alstom and Bombardier, was ordered.

Schedule between New York and Boston is 3 hours 34 minutes, an average speed of only . With a 15-minute layover in New York, the entire end-to-end trip averages .

Plans for 2008–2013
The largest project for American high-speed rail is the California High-Speed Rail network, which was authorized by voters with Proposition 1A in 2008. In August 2013, Tutor Perini signed a $1-billion contract to begin construction of the first phase in 2014. Construction began in early 2015. In May 2019, President Donald Trump canceled major federal grants which funded the project, worth approximately $929 million US dollars.

High-speed rail development was a goal of the Obama administration which came into office in January 2009. Higher jet fuel prices, congested airports and highways, and increasing airport security rules have combined to make high-speed rail a more attractive option for passengers. A study conducted by the International Union of Railways indicated that high-speed trains produced one fifth as much CO2 as automobiles and jet aircraft.

In 2012, then-Amtrak president Joseph Boardman proposed a plan to build a dedicated high-speed rail line between Washington, D.C. and Boston. He estimated it would cost $151 billion and take more than 25 years to design and build the line.

Current state and regional efforts

The Northeast

Northeast Corridor

Amtrak officials released a concept report for next-generation high-speed rail within the Northeast Corridor (NEC) on October 1, 2010. Amtrak projected planning and construction of the next-generation high-speed Northeast Corridor line to cost approximately $117 billion (2010 dollars) and reduce the travel time from New York to Washington, including a stop in Philadelphia, to 96 minutes, and the travel time from Boston to New York to 84 minutes by 2040. In 2012, Amtrak released the details of the proposal.

The first of two phases envisions the NEC to be upgraded allowing Acela speed improvements. By 2022, Acela trainsets will be replaced with new trainsets, named Avelia Liberty. The new trainsets will be limited to the maximum speed supported by the NEC.

In 2012, the Federal Railroad Administration began developing a master plan for bringing high-speed rail to the Northeast Corridor titled NEC FUTURE, and released the final environmental impact statement in December 2016. The proposed alignment would closely follow the existing NEC south of New York City; multiple potential alignments north of New York City were studied, including the existing shoreline route, a route through Hartford, Connecticut, and a route out along Long Island which would traverse a new bridge or tunnel across Long Island Sound to Connecticut. On July 12, 2017, the Federal Railroad Administration revealed the record of decision for the project. The proposed upgrades have not been funded.

In 2013, Japanese officials pitched the country's maglev train technology, the world's fastest, for the Northeast Corridor to regional U.S. politicians. The trains could travel from New York to Washington in an hour. Northeast Maglev, using SCMaglev technology developed by Central Japan Railway Company, is currently working with the FRA and MDOT to prepare an Environmental Impact Statement.  The project has received a $27.8 million grant from the FRA.

New York 

New York has been actively discussing high-speed rail service since the 1990s, but thus far little progress has been made. Amtrak Acela service between Washington, D.C. and Boston is available to New York City, but other cities remain isolated from high-speed rail service. Further, destinations outside the New York metropolitan area have been plagued by delayed service for decades. Nonetheless, New York has been quietly endorsing and even implementing rail improvements for years.

Closer and faster railroad transportation links between New York City and the rest of the state are frequently cited as a partial solution to Upstate's stagnant economic growth.

Beginning in 2010, a study conducted by the New York State Department of Transportation identified 10 alternatives for improving the Empire Corridor. In early 2014, a Tier 1 Draft Environmental Impact Statement was released for public review and comments.

Pennsylvania 

The Keystone Corridor is a  rail corridor between Philadelphia and Pittsburgh, composed of two different rail lines, the Amtrak Philadelphia to Harrisburg Main Line and the Norfolk Southern Pittsburgh Line. Between Philadelphia and Harrisburg the Amtrak line is electrified and grade separation was completed in 2014. Between Harrisburg and Pittsburgh the Norfolk Southern owned line is used for freight transportation. In 1999, the Keystone Corridor was formally recognized as a "designated high-speed corridor" by the Federal Railroad Administration (FRA). The line, over which Amtrak's Pennsylvanian and Keystone Service routes operate, was upgraded in 2006 with two segments of  track.

Western States

California 

California Proposition 1A, passed in November 2008, authorized the state to issue $9.95 billion in bonds to fund the first phase of a planned multi-phase high-speed rail network. Los Angeles to San Francisco via the Central Valley was expected to be the first phase of the network, though the initial operating segments have since become unclear. The California High-Speed Rail Authority (CHSRA) is the lead agency charged with planning and implementing the system. The state was awarded $2.55 billion in funding from the federal government in 2010.

Since the passage of Proposition 1A, cost estimates for the project have risen due to increased planning and disputes over routes. Ridership projections have faced scrutiny by a number of groups including the Reason Foundation. In May 2013, with cost estimates double the original figures approved by the voters in 2008, opponents filed lawsuits intended to invalidate the $10 billion bond measures which were part of the financing of the rail line.

By December 2018, the Authority had  of right-of-way from Madera to near Bakersfield under contract and in construction. However, the estimated cost of a now scaled down system had increased from $33.6 billion to $77.3 billion and, including federal funding, the California High-Speed Rail Authority had only about $12.7 billion - approximately one-eighth of the funding required. Governor Gavin Newsom has still expressed support for the project despite the funding shortfall, reduced scope, and swelling costs.

XpressWest, a private undertaking begun in 2005 to build a high-speed service to Las Vegas, Nevada, was acquired by Brightline in 2018 and its name changed to Brightline West. In April 2020, The California Infrastructure and Economic Development Bank approved $3.25 billion in tax-exempt private activity bonds for the project and acquired a 50-year lease from Caltrans for use of the Interstate 15 corridor. The line is expected to open from the Victor Valley to a station near the Las Vegas Strip in 2026.

Pacific Northwest 

The Pacific Northwest Corridor or the Pacific Northwest Rail Corridor is one of eleven federally designated high-speed rail corridors in the United States. It was designated a high-speed rail by the Intermodal Surface Transportation Efficiency Act of 1991 (ISTEA).

The Cascadia high-speed rail was a proposed dedicated high-speed rail line that would have connected Salem/Portland, Vancouver WA/Olympia/Tacoma/Seattle/Everett, and Bellingham, Washington.

As of 2012, neither the Washington State Department of Transportation nor Oregon plan to implement speeds higher than  due to safety and other freight service concerns voiced by the track owner, Union Pacific Railroad. The plan to provide high-speed and higher-speed rail services on this corridor was thus halted.

In early 2018, Washington State pledged money to studying ultra-high-speed rail between Vancouver BC, Seattle, and Portland With  speed operation. After a preliminary study, the state pledged $300,000 in funding and was shortly backed by British Columbia. The study is estimated to be completed by early 2019. Washington State Governor Jay Inslee has expressed his desire to see a Cascadia innovation corridor, linking together the main economic centers of the Pacific Northwest.

New Mexico
A High speed line stretching from El Paso, Texas, through New Mexico (following the Rio Grande Valley) with a stop in Albuquerque, to Denver, Colorado has been proposed.

Mid-Atlantic and the South

Florida

Development of a high-speed rail system in Florida was mandated by a constitutional referendum in 2000 but taken off the books by another referendum in 2004. Florida resurrected its high-speed rail authority to capitalize on the nationwide effort to build a high-speed rail network. Florida legislature approved SunRail in a special session in late 2009, which along with work already completed on the originally proposed line between Tampa and Orlando, was instrumental in the state winning a significant amount of the total amount allotted to high-speed rail. Only California received more high-speed rail funding than Florida. In February 2011, Florida's newly elected governor Rick Scott cancelled the project. Secretary of Transportation Ray LaHood then announced he would be redirecting the funds intended for Florida to other states.

Southeast 

The Southeast High-Speed Rail Corridor is a passenger rail transportation project to extend high-speed passenger rail services from Washington, D.C. south through Richmond and Petersburg in Virginia through Raleigh and Charlotte in North Carolina and connect with the existing high-speed rail corridor from DC to Boston, Massachusetts known as the Northeast Corridor. Since first established in 1992, the U.S. Department of Transportation (USDOT) has since extended the corridor to Atlanta and Macon, Georgia; Greenville, South Carolina; Columbia, South Carolina; Jacksonville, Florida; and Birmingham, Alabama.

Incremental rail improvements to existing rail lines have been taking place while the environmental impact study required under the National Environmental Policy Act is being completed. The two-tiered EIS began in 1999, and completion is expected in 2011, with passenger service expected by 2015 to 2020, depending upon funding availability.

Atlanta–Charlotte corridor

Another project has been proposed between Atlanta and Charlotte; it is planned to be in service by 2050. The estimated cost to establish a new high-speed corridor between the two cities was between $6.2 billion to $8.4 billion in 2021 when the preferred route, running from Charlotte Gateway Station to Hartsfield-Jackson Atlanta International Airport, was selected.

Texas 
In 1991, the Texas High-Speed Rail Authority awarded a 50-year high-speed rail franchise to the Texas TGV Corporation — a consortium of Morrison-Knudsen (USA), Bombardier (Canada), Alstom (France/UK), Crédit Lyonnais (France), Banque IndoSuez (France), Merrill Lynch (USA), and others. Texas TGV won the franchise after more than two years of litigation instigated by a rival consortium backing German ICE technology.

The plan was to connect the "Texas Triangle" (Houston − Dallas/Fort Worth − San Antonio) with a privately financed high-speed train system which would quickly take passengers from one city to the next at prices designed to compete with or beat other transport options. This was the same model Southwest Airlines used 20 years earlier to break into the Texas market where it served the same three cities.

Funding for the project was to come entirely from private sources, since Texas did not allow the use of public money. The original estimated cost was $5.6 billion, but the task of securing the necessary private funds proved extremely difficult.

Southwest Airlines, with the help of lobbyists, created legal barriers to prohibit the consortium from moving forward and the entire project was eventually scuttled in 1994, when the State of Texas withdrew the franchise. Several hotel chains like Days Inn, Best Western, and La Quinta Inn, as well as fast food establishments like McDonald's and Burger King lobbied against the plan, primarily because many of their locations were along Interstates and in several highway-dependent rural towns.

Another proposal for high-speed rail in Texas was part of a larger proposed, statewide super-infrastructure, the Trans-Texas Corridor. In 2002, Governor Rick Perry proposed the project, but it was eventually canceled by the legislature in 2009.

In 2002, the Texas High-Speed Rail and Transportation Corporation (THSRTC), a grass roots organization dedicated to bringing high-speed rail to Texas was established. In 2006, American Airlines and Continental Airlines formally joined THSRTC, in an effort to bring high-speed rail to Texas as a passenger collector system for the airlines. The Texas High-Speed Rail and Transportation Corporation developed the Texas T-Bone and Brazos Express corridors to link Central Texas.

In 2010, Texas Department of Transportation (TxDOT) received a federal grant to study a high-speed rail corridor linking Oklahoma City with Dallas–Fort Worth. The state also received another grant in 2011 to start engineering and environmental work on a high-speed link between Houston and Dallas. Another study was being conducted in 2012 by TxDOT on a possible link between Houston and Austin.

While the preliminary work was in progress by TxDOT for the Houston to Dallas line, an unrelated project to build a high-speed railway between the two cities was announced in 2011 by a private company, Lone Star High-Speed Rail. The company was founded in 2009 by U.S. Japan High-Speed Rail to market the use of N700-I bullet train in Texas. In 2012, the company with a new name, Texas Central Railway Company, announced that Central Japan Railway Company signed up to be the primary investor in the project with the total estimated cost of $10 billion to be privately funded. The preliminary engineering, market and financing studies have been started for the service with maximum speed of 205 miles per hour and travel time of 90 minutes. The plan was to seek additional investors in late 2012, start the construction in 2014, and begin the service in 2024.

New Developments 
On September 21, 2020, a high-speed train from Houston to Dallas received federal approval. The railroad aims to cut travel time between the two cities to 90 minutes. According to the company in charge of the project, Texas Central Railroad, the Federal Railroad Administration approved construction to begin in early 2021. The company estimates that construction could take up to six years and cost roughly $20 billion.

Engineering and infrastructure development company, AECOM, has emerged as one of the top companies to steer-head the potential project. AECOM recently partnered with technology companies Virgin Hyperloop One and Arrivo  to begin consulting with local city and state governments about urban planning. Steven Duong, the head urban planner for AECOM, claimed that cross-state high-speed rail as a system of transportation with both passengers and freight is "reasonable.

Midwest

Illinois and the Midwest 

The Midwest Regional Rail Initiative or Midwest Regional Rail System (MRRI, MWRRI, or MWRRS) is a plan to implement a  passenger rail network in the Midwestern United States, using Chicago, Illinois as a hub. Primary routes would stretch across Illinois, Indiana, Michigan, Minnesota, Ohio, and Wisconsin, possibly reaching Kentucky. Secondary routes would operate at a slower speed across Missouri and Iowa, just touching Nebraska and nearly reaching Kansas.

Construction to provide higher-speed rail services between Chicago and St. Louis is taking place. Illinois has been one of the most aggressive at pursuing highspeed rail, getting $1.1 billion in 2010. Governor Quinn said that "we want to make this corridor the pre-eminent one in America". Construction is being carried out from the southern part of the state to the north. The first installment of funds provided for construction between Alton and Lincoln. In March 2011, the next installment of funds ($685 million) provided for another section to go from Lincoln to Dwight. In May 2011, additional funds were allocated for further construction between Dwight and Joliet.

In June 2011, Illinois commenced a study on implementing a  service between Chicago and Champaign-Urbana. Legislation passed in 2013 gives the Illinois Tollway the power to build high-speed rail lines.

On May 9, 2011, the state received $196.5 million to extend the higher speed rail upgrades from Kalamazoo an additional  to Dearborn, Michigan. The improvements would reduce the travel time from Chicago to Detroit to roughly 5 hours. Michigan had received more than $161 million for high-speed rail and $40 million for Amtrak stations in Troy, Battle Creek and Dearborn.

About  of the Michigan trains' route passes through a congested area of northwestern Indiana along Lake Michigan's south shore, where trains are regularly delayed by freight traffic. In early 2010 the federal government authorized some $71.4 million for this project.

In Minnesota, there was a proposed high-speed rail service from Rochester to the Twin Cities called Zip Rail. Zip Rail was proposed to be a public–private partnership with public funding for capital costs and private investment for operations, maintenance and growing ridership. The Zip Rail project was discontinued in 2016.

As a result, scheduled travel times between Chicago and St. Louis were reduced by about 15 minutes when Amtrak timetables were adjusted in December 2021. There is no target date for  trains yet.

The Southwest 

The cities of Denver, Las Vegas, Reno, Phoenix and Salt Lake City have formed the Western High Speed Rail Alliance, which is slated to spend $11 million over three years to study the feasibility of building railway links between the major cities of the southwestern United States, as well as linking to the California high-speed corridor via Las Vegas.

In June 2012, the developer of XpressWest, formerly known as DesertXpress, announced that they expanded the planned high-speed rail network to include links to Phoenix, Salt Lake City and Denver. The XpressWest plan was supported by the Western High Speed Rail Alliance.

Federal high-speed rail initiatives 
In February 2009, as part of the American Recovery and Reinvestment Act (ARRA), Congress allocated $8 billion to be granted to states for intercity rail projects, with "priority to projects that support the development of intercity high-speed rail service."

American Recovery and Reinvestment Act of 2009

Strategic plan 

In April 2009, as required by ARRA, the FRA released its strategic plan describing the agency's vision for developing high-speed rail in the United States. As potential funding targets, the plan formally identified ten corridors (all previously designated as high-speed rail corridors by several successive Secretaries of Transportation) as well as the Northeast Corridor. The ten designated high-speed corridors, together with the major cities served by each, are:
 Southeast Corridor—Washington, Richmond, Newport News, Norfolk, Raleigh, Durham, Greensboro, Charlotte, Greenville, Atlanta, Columbia, Jacksonville
 California Corridor—Sacramento, San Francisco, San Jose, Fresno, Los Angeles, San Diego, Las Vegas
 Pacific Northwest Corridor—Eugene, Portland, Seattle, Vancouver
 South Central Corridor—Tulsa, Oklahoma City, Dallas, Austin, San Antonio, Texarkana, and Little Rock
 Gulf Coast Corridor—Houston, New Orleans, Mobile
 Chicago Hub Network—Chicago, Indianapolis, Detroit, Springfield, Cleveland, Toledo, Columbus, Dayton, Cincinnati, Kansas City, St. Louis, Louisville, Milwaukee, Minneapolis/St. Paul
 Florida Corridor—Tampa, Orlando, Miami
 Keystone Corridor—Pittsburgh, Philadelphia, Harrisburg
 Empire Corridor—Buffalo, Rochester, Syracuse, Utica, Schenectady and Albany
 Northern New England Corridor—Boston, Portland/Auburn, Montreal, Springfield, New Haven

In addition to the $8 billion provided by ARRA, the plan predicted an additional $5 billion over 5 years would be made annually available for projects to "jump-start a potential world-class passenger rail system." On June 17, 2009, the FRA advised grant applicants that evaluation for funding would be based on a proposal's potential to make trips quicker and more convenient, reduce congestion on highways and at airports, and meet other environmental, energy, and safety goals.

2009 federal grant funding

The FRA received grant applications from states for stimulus funds and FY 2009 intercity capital funds in August and October 2009 Over $57 billion in requests were filed from 34 states and on January 28, 2010, 31 states and 13 rail corridors received funding.
The five areas receiving the most funding had originally been designated as high-speed rail corridors in October 1992 following passage of the Intermodal Surface Transportation Efficiency Act of 1991.

2010 allocation
Congress allocated $2.5 billion in the FY 2010 budget and these funds were allocated on October 28, 2010. Major allocations are listed below.

Cancellation of funds for Wisconsin, Ohio, and Florida 
On December 10, 2010, Transportation Secretary Ray LaHood announced $1.2 billion in grants for Wisconsin and Ohio would be removed, and redirected to other states. This was due to opposition from governors-elect in both states, Scott Walker of Wisconsin and John Kasich of Ohio. From the redirected funds, California received $624 million, Florida $342 million, Washington $161 million, and Illinois $42 million.

On February 16, 2011, Former Florida Governor Rick Scott formally announced that he would be rejecting all federal funds to construct a high-speed railway project in the state, thereby killing the Florida High-Speed Rail project. Governor Scott's reasoning behind canceling the project was that it would be "too costly to taxpayers" and that "the risk far outweigh[ed] the benefits". Those funds were once again redistributed to other states.

2011 and 2012 proposals and rejections of funding
In February 2011, Vice President Biden proposed spending $53 billion on improved passenger rail service over six years. The plan drew fire from majority Republicans in the House of Representatives, who preferred private investment rather than government investment. No money was appropriated for passenger rail in either the FY 2011 or FY 2012 budgets.

See also 

 High-speed rail
 High-speed rail in Canada
 Maglev train proposals in the United States
 Rail transportation in the United States
 Speed limits in the United States (rail)
 Turboliner
 UAC TurboTrain

Notes

Further reading

External links 

High Speed Rail Overview - Federal Railroad Administration
US High Speed Rail Association